Karrari also known as Karari is a town and a nagar panchayat in Kaushambi district in the Indian state of Uttar Pradesh.

Demographics
 India census, Karari had a population of 16,467. Males constitute 51.5% of the population, females 48.5% Karari has an average literacy rate of 72.2%, higher than state average of 67.7%: male literacy is 78.7%, and female literacy is 65.4%. In Karari, 15.5% of the population is under 6 years of age.

Transport 

Karari is situated about 45 km from Allahabad and 13 km from Bharwari railway station.
It is near Chitrakut Dham, and the living place (Rajapur) of poet Tulsi Das, who had written immortal poetic book known as Shri Ram Charitra Manas. Karari can be reached through bus from Allahabad railway station and lot of Zeeps are available from Chauphatka (Allahabad).

Schools and colleges 

Karari is emerge as education hub for nearby areas there are following colleges—Dr. Rizvi Degree College, Dr. Rizvi College of law, Dr. Rizvi Engeeniering College, Karari Inter College, Riyaz Intermediate College, Allama Jawwadi Inter College, and Mother India Inter College. Riyaz intermediate college. United public school.

Navagrah temple 

Navagrah temple was built by Somnath Verma. It was opened to the public in 2017.

Cities and towns in Kaushambi district